The boys' 50 metre butterfly event at the 2018 Summer Youth Olympics took place on 10 and 11 October at the Natatorium in Buenos Aires, Argentina.

Results

Heats
The heats were started on 10 October at 10:00.

Semifinals
The semifinals were started on 10 October at 19:00.

Final
The final was held on 11 October at 18:48.

References

Swimming at the 2018 Summer Youth Olympics